Barry Callender (born 24 April 1967) is a Barbadian cricketer. He played in one List A match for the Barbados cricket team in 1994/95.

See also
 List of Barbadian representative cricketers

References

External links
 

1967 births
Living people
Barbadian cricketers
Barbados cricketers